Kelly Gallardo (born November 20), also known by the stage name "Kelly", is a radio disc jockey in the Philippines.

Career 
Since starting her broadcasting career in 1992 (Rajah Broadcasting Network and Manila Broadcasting Company), she has worked as a DJ and production supervisor. She has taught radio production to college students earlier in her career.

Lending her voice to many local and foreign radio and TV ads, she is best identified with her work on Nickelodeon. She is also a contributing writer for Total Woman magazine.

She was one of the top-rated deejays on Magic 89.9. She planned to release a book titled "Kellybites", based on a segment from her radio show.

She joined 99.5 Hit FM on August 20, 2007, 103.5 Max FM on January 21, 2008, and later Radio Boracay since April 2011. She is also currently a donor/member of Project Brave Kids Foundation.

Radio shows
Midday Play (Magic 89.9) (2004–2007)
Mornings with Kelly and Tin (99.5 Hit FM) (2007)
Kellybites Nights (103.5 Max FM) (2008)
The Bite Club (103.5 Max FM) (2008–2009)
KellyBites Radio (podcast) (2010–2011)
KellyBites Radio (Radio Boracay RB106) (2011–present)

References

External links
Kelly's official blog

Living people
Filipino radio personalities
Year of birth missing (living people)